Leopold Lindtberg (born in Vienna on 1 June 1902; died in Sils im Engadin/Segl on 18 April 1984) was an Austrian Swiss film and theatre director. He fled Austria due to the Machtergreifung in Germany and ultimately settled in Switzerland. 

His sister Hedwig was married to the Austrian/American musicologist Felix Salzer.

Awards 

 1941 Coppa Mussolini for Die Missbrauchten Liebesbriefe (The abused love letters)
 1946 Golden Globe for The Last Chance 
 1946 International Film Festival of Cannes 1946: Grand Prix and International Peace Prize for The Last Chance
 1951 One of four inaugural Golden Bears at the Berlinale 1951 for Four in a Jeep
 1953 Bronze Bear for Unser Dorf (Our Village) at the Berlinale 1953
 1953 Silver laurel of David O. Selznick Award for  Unser Dorf (Our Village) 
 1956 Josef Kainz Medal
 1958 Member of the Berlin Academy of Fine Arts
 1958 Price of Zurich for  Unser Dorf (Our Village) 
 1959 Film of the City of Zurich for Vorposten der Menschheit (Outpost of Humanity)
 1959 appointed professor by the President of the Republic of Austria
 1961 Golden Needle of the Schauspielhaus Zurich
 1969 Hans Reinhart Ring
 1974 Honorary Member of the Burgtheater
 1976 Nestroy Ring
 1982 Raymond Ring

Selected filmography 
 1932 Wenn zwei sich streiten
 1935 Jä-soo
 1938 Füsilier Wipf
 1939 Constable Studer
 1940 Die missbrauchten Liebesbriefe
 1941 Landammann Stauffacher
 1944 Marie-Louise
 1945 Die letzte Chance
 1947 Madness Rules
 1949 Swiss Tour (Ein Seemann ist kein Schneemann)
 1951 Four in a Jeep
 1953 The Village

References

External links 
 
 Leopold Lindtberg at the Swiss Film Directory

Austrian film directors
Swiss film directors
German-language film directors
Austrian theatre directors
Swiss theatre directors
Swiss people of Austrian descent
1902 births
1984 deaths
Directors of Palme d'Or winners
Directors of Golden Bear winners